This is a list of American television-related events in 1955.

Events

Television programs

Debuts

Changing network affiliation

Ending this year

Television stations

Station launches

Network affiliation changes

Station closures

Births

Deaths

See also
1955 in television 
1955 in film 
1955 in the United States 
List of American films of 1955

References

External links
List of 1955 American television series at IMDb